Who Are My Parents? (also known as A Little Child Shall Lead Them) is a 1922 American silent drama film directed by J. Searle Dawley and starring L. Rogers Lytton, Peggy Shaw, Florence Billings, Ernest Hilliard, and Robert Agnew. The film was released by Fox Film Corporation on November 26, 1922.

Cast
L. Rogers Lytton as Colonel Lewis (as Roger Lytton)
Peggy Shaw as Betty Lewis
Florence Billings as Barbara Draper
Ernest Hilliard as Frank Draper
Robert Agnew as Bob Hale
Adelaide Prince as Mrs. Tyler
Niles Welch as Ken (her son)
Marie Reichardt as Hannah
Florence Haas as Orphan
Jimmie Lapsley as Orphan
Leonard Rosenfeld as Lazy Bill

Preservation
The film is now considered lost.

See also
List of lost films
1937 Fox vault fire

References

External links

1922 drama films
Silent American drama films
1922 films
American silent feature films
American black-and-white films
Fox Film films
Lost American films
1922 lost films
Lost drama films
Films directed by J. Searle Dawley
1920s American films